Luc's Lantern is an album by bassist and composer William Parker which was recorded in 2004 and released on the Thirsty Ear label.

Reception

The AllMusic review states: "Luc's Lantern is something of a departure--it's a piano trio session that evokes the poignant lyricism and straightforward intimacy of 1960s works by Bill Evans, Herbie Hancock, and Monty Alexander. While there are indeed "free" moments, Lantern, on the whole, shines a contemplative, relaxing, and slightly melancholy light".

Pitchfork observed "with its adroit, seemingly effortless take on traditionalism, Luc's Lantern should prove to be as accessible a point of entry as a newcomer could hope for, and as a refreshing, uncomplicated rear-view glance for Parker's established jazz audience".

JazzTimes noted "the three musicians show a restraint that's all the more admirable for sounding unstudied".

The All About Jazz review said "This amazing trio sounds as if it is a working trio—fresh, relaxed, and assured, and with great affinity towards Parker's rhythmic leadership. Hopefully it will become a regular working trio, maturing with future releases".

Track listing
All compositions by William Parker
 "Adena" - 5:12  
 "Song for Tyler" - 4:18  
 "Mourning Sunset" - 7:09  
 "Evening Star Song" - 3:33  
 "Luc's Lantern" - 6:33  
 "Jaki" - 4:17  
 "Bud in Alphaville" - 3:35  
 "Charcoal Flower" - 5:13  
 "Phoenix" - 5:28  
 "Candlesticks on the Lake" - 1:20

Personnel
William Parker - bass
Eri Yamamoto - piano
Michael Thompson - drums

References

2005 albums
Thirsty Ear Recordings albums
William Parker (musician) albums